Düsseldorf Open may refer to:

Düsseldorf Open (ATP Tour)
Düsseldorf Open (WTA Tour)